Liberty was the name of a number of steamships, including:

 , a Lancashire and Yorkshire Railway ship
 , a number of ships built in 1918 carried this name

Ship names